Future City may refer to:

Future City, Illinois
Future City, Kentucky
Future City Competition